Ronald D. McLaurin (8 October 1945 – 12 June 1995) was an essayist and American publisher who explored the themes of propaganda, misinformation, and subversion.

Published works 
 The Middle East in Soviet Policy, Lexington Books, (1975)
 Foreign Policy Making in the Middle East: Domestic Influences on Policy in Egypt, Iraq, Israel and Syria, (1977)
 Political Role of Minorities in the Middle East, Praeger Publishers Inc., (1979)
 Beyond Camp David: Emerging Alignments and Leaders in the Middle East, with Paul A. Jureidini, (1981)
 Military Propaganda: Psychological Warfare and Operations, Praeger Publishers, (1982)
 The Battle of Zahle, (1986)
 The Battle of Tyre, (1987)
 Modern Experience in City Combat, PN, ASIN: B00CJJCOWC, (1987)
 Alliance Under Tension: The Evolution of South Korean-U.S. Relations, with Manwoo Lee and Chung-In Moon, Westview Press, (1988)
 The Battle of Sidon, (1989)
 The Dilemma of Third World Defense Industry:  Supplier or Recipient Control Autonomy with Baek Kwang-Il, Westview Press, (1989)
 Military strength in urban anti-terrorism, US Army Human Engineering Laboratory, (1989)
 The United States and the defense of the Pacific, with Chung-in Moon, Kyungnam University Press, (1989)

References

1945 births
1995 deaths
American essayists
American publishers (people)
20th-century American businesspeople
20th-century essayists